Ryan Pinney (born November 10, 1980) is an American Para-cyclist who represented the United States at the 2020 Summer Paralympics.

Career
Pinney represented the United States at the 2020 Summer Paralympics in the mixed team relay H1–5 event and won a bronze medal.

Personal life
Pinney served as an aerial refueler in the United States Air Force and the Arizona National Guard for 14 years.

Pinney broke his back while BMX riding in 2012, leaving him paralyzed from the waist down.

References

Living people
1980 births
American male cyclists
Sportspeople from Phoenix, Arizona
People with paraplegia
Paralympic cyclists of the United States
Cyclists at the 2020 Summer Paralympics
Medalists at the 2020 Summer Paralympics
Paralympic medalists in cycling
Paralympic bronze medalists for the United States